The men's featherweight event was part of the boxing programme at the 1992 Summer Olympics. The weight class allowed boxers of up to 57 kilograms to compete. The competition was held from 29 July to 9 August 1992. 31 boxers from 31 nations competed.

Medalists

Results
The following boxers took part in the event:

First round
 Park Duk-Kyu (KOR) – BYE
 Sandagsuren Erdenebat (MGL) def. Rodrigue Boucka (GAB), 21:4
 Andreas Tews (GER) def. Kirkor Kirkorov (BUL), 9:5
 Djamel Lifa (FRA) def. Charlie Balena (PHI), 20:12
 Hocine Soltani (ALG) def. Jorge Maglione (ARG), RSCH-1 (02:31)
 Carlos Gerena (PUR) def. Narendar Bisth Singh (IND), 20:11
 Steven Chungu (ZAM) def. Paul Griffin (IRL), RSC-2 (00:26)
 Victoriano Damian (DOM) def. Eddy Sáenz (NCA), 23:14
 Eddy Suarez (CUB) def. Lee Chil-Gun (PRK), 20:5
 Mohamed Soltani (TUN) def. Davis Lusimbo (UGA), 13:8
 Somluck Kamsing (THA) def. Michael Strange (CAN), 11:9
 Faustino Reyes (ESP) def. Brian Carr (GBR), 22:10
 Daniel Dumitrescu (ROM) def. James Nicolson (AUS), RSCH-2 (01:53)
 Heritovo Rakotomanga (MAD) def. Wasesa Sabuni (SWE), 22:14
 Ramazan Palyani (EUN) def. Julian Wheeler (USA), 8:4
 Rogerio Brito (BRA) def. Steven Kevi (PNG), 20:6

Second round
 Park Duk-Kyu (KOR) def. Sandagsuren Erdenebat (MGL), 13:2
 Andreas Tews (GER) def. Djamel Lifa (FRA), 9:4
 Hocine Soltani (ALG) def. Carlos Gerena (PUR), 23:0
 Victoriano Damian (DOM) def. Steven Chungu (ZAM), 11:9
 Eddy Suarez (CUB) def. Mohamed Soltani (TUN), RSC-2 (02:53)
 Faustino Reyes (ESP) def. Somluck Kamsing (THA), 24:15
 Daniel Dumitrescu (ROM) def. Heritovo Rakotomanga (MAD), 18:8
 Ramazan Palyani (EUN) def. Rogerio Brito (BRA), 19:2

Quarterfinals
 Andreas Tews (GER) def. Duk-Kyu Park (KOR), 17:7
 Hocine Soltani (ALG) def. Victoriano Damian (DOM), 13:4
 Faustino Reyes (ESP) def. Eddy Suarez (CUB), 17:7
 Ramazan Palyani (EUN) def. Daniel Dumitrescu (ROM), 11:5

Semifinals
 Andreas Tews (GER) def. Hocine Soltani (ALG), 11:1
 Faustino Reyes (ESP) def. Ramazan Palyani (EUN), 14:9

Final
 Andreas Tews (GER) def. Faustino Reyes (ESP), 16:9

References

Featherweight